EMS Corridor is an emerging Electronics Manufacturing Services (EMS) corridor in Chennai. It stretches from Sriperumbudur to Oragadam to the west of Chennai.

EMS hub of India
The corridor is emerging as an EMS hub of India. Many companies like Dell, Nokia, Nokia Siemens Network,  Motorola, Cisco, Samsung, Siemens, Sony-Ericsson, Flextronics, Foxconn, Alcatel, Texas Instruments, Laird plc, Salcomp, ProWorks, Perlos(LOM), Power Wave Tech, Jabil Green and Sanmina-SCI have set up their plants in this corridor with an investment of approximately $1 billion.

See also
 EMS Industry in Chennai
 Rajiv Gandhi Salai
 Automotive Corridor
 SEZ Corridor

References

High-technology business districts in Chennai
Electronics industry in India